Sokół, stage name of Wojciech Sosnowski (born March 11, 1977), is a Polish MC born in Warsaw, Poland 11 March 1977. Since his debut show and the first track on the DJ 600V album in 1997, Sokół has released 13 studio albums with various music projects, such as ZIP Skład (1999), WWO (in the years 2000–2005, one of them went double platinum, and two others sold gold), Sokół i Marysia Starosta (both platinum - 2011, 2013), Sokół feat. Pono (2007–2009, two gold).

His albums and singles achieved 24 platinum and several gold record awards.

He lives in Poland, but lived also in Czech Republic, Latvia and Georgia for over three years. Esteemed for his texts and thoroughgoing rap. Founder and co-owner of Prosto record label and clothing company.

Discography

Studio albums

Music videos

Guest appearances

References

External links
 

Living people
1977 births
Rappers from Warsaw